Great Fish River Mouth Wetland Nature Reserve is a wetland nature reserve that lies at the confluence of the Kap River, on the southern bank of the Great Fish River near Port Alfred. Neighbouring it is the Kap River Nature Reserve.

History 
This  reserve was designated in 1988.

See also 

 List of protected areas of South Africa

References 

Nature reserves in South Africa